The Tulkarm Subdistrict was one of the subdistricts of Mandatory Palestine. It was located around the city of Tulkarm. After the 1948 Arab-Israeli War, the subdistrict disintegrated, the western part became part of the Central District of Israel and the eastern part, became a part of the Jordanian annexation of the West Bank  from 1948 to 1967). Most of the eastern part is today the Tulkarm Governorate, part of the State of Palestine.

Depopulated towns and villages

(current localities in parentheses)

 Khirbat Bayt Lid (Nordia)
 Bayyarat Hannun 
 Fardisya (Sha'ar Efraim on nearby lands)
 Ghabat Kafr Sur (Beit Yehoshua, Kfar Neter, Tel Yitzhak)
 al-Jalama (Lahavot Chaviva)
 Kafr Saba (Beyt Berl, HaKramim (neighborhood in Modi'in-Maccabim-Re'ut), Neve Yamin)
 Khirbat al-Majdal (Sde Yitzhak)
 al-Manshiyya (Ahituv, Ein HaHoresh, Givat Haim)
 Miska (Mishmeret, Sde Warburg)
 Qaqun (Gan Yoshiya, Haniel, HaMa'apil, Olesh, Ometz, Yikon)
 Raml Zayta (Sde Yitzhak)
 Tabsur (Batzra, Ra'anana suburbs)
 Umm Khalid  (Netanya suburbs)
 Wadi al-Hawarith (Geulei Teiman, Kfar Haroeh, Kfar Vitkin)
 Wadi Qabbani
 Khirbat al-Zababida
 Khirbat Zalafa (Givat Oz)

Subdistricts of Mandatory Palestine